BR-259 is a federal highway in the southeastern Brazil. The road covers 711.7 km from Felixlândia, Minas Gerais to João Neiva, Espírito Santo.

References

Federal highways in Brazil